a.k.a. Tora-san and a Lord is a 1977 Japanese comedy film directed by Yoji Yamada. It stars Kiyoshi Atsumi as Torajirō Kuruma (Tora-san), and Kyōko Maya as his love interest or "Madonna". Tora-san Meets His Lordship is the nineteenth entry in the popular, long-running Otoko wa Tsurai yo series.

Synopsis
Tora-san returns to his family home in Shibamata, Tokyo, but soon leaves again due to squabbles involving a dog they have named Tora-san. During his travels in Shikoku, Tora-san makes the acquaintance of a descendant of a local daimyō. The old man asks Tora-san to find his son's widow in Tokyo, whom he had previously alienated.

Cast
 Kiyoshi Atsumi as Torajirō
 Chieko Baisho as Sakura
 Kyōko Maya as Mariko Tsutsumi
 Masami Shimojō as Kuruma Tatsuzō
 Chieko Misaki as Tsune Kuruma (Torajiro's aunt)
 Gin Maeda as Hiroshi Suwa
 Hisao Dazai as Boss (Umetarō Katsura)
 Gajirō Satō as Genkō
 Hayato Nakamura as Mitsuo Suwa
 Yoshio Yoshida as Leader
 Akira Terao as Officer
 Kanjūrō Arashi as Todo
 Norihei Miki as Yoshida

Critical appraisal
Tora-san Meets His Lordship was the ninth top money-maker at the Japanese box-office in 1977. Kiyoshi Atsumi and Chieko Baisho were nominated for Best Actor and Best Actress respectively at the Japan Academy Prize ceremony for their roles in Tora-san Meets His Lordship and other films in which they had appeared in 1977. Stuart Galbraith IV writes that the film, though not as popular as its predecessor Tora's Pure Love, is a strong entry in the Otoko wa Tsurai yo series, funny and with an exceptionally good supporting cast. The German-language site molodezhnaja gives Tora-san Meets His Lordship three and a half out of five stars.

Availability
Tora-san Meets His Lordship was released theatrically on August 6, 1977. In Japan, the film was released on videotape in 1996, and in DVD format in 2005 and 2008.

References

Bibliography

English

German

Japanese

External links
 Tora-san Meets His Lordship at www.tora-san.jp (official site)

1977 films
Films directed by Yoji Yamada
1977 comedy films
1970s Japanese-language films
Otoko wa Tsurai yo films
Japanese sequel films
Shochiku films
Films with screenplays by Yôji Yamada
1970s Japanese films